"Tell Me" is the fourth single by Japanese musician hide, released on March 24, 1994. It reached number 4 on the Oricon Singles Chart. The B-side "Scanner (Ai no Duet?)" is a different version of "Scanner" from Hide Your Face, as it features vocals by Ryuichi from Luna Sea. The single was certified Gold by the RIAJ in April 1994, and Double Platinum in February 2020 for sales over 500,000.

A re-recording of "Tell Me", that features Spread Beaver playing, was released on January 19, 2000, under the hide with Spread Beaver name. This version reached number 2 on the Oricon chart and was certified Gold by the RIAJ in January 2000 for sales over 200,000.

The original version was re-released on December 12, 2007, with a new cover. On April 28, 2010, it was re-released again as part of the first releases in "The Devolution Project", which was a release of hide's original eleven singles on picture disc vinyl.

Track listing
All songs written by hide.
1994 Original release

2000 Re-recording

Personnel
1994 Recording
 hide – vocals, guitar, producer, arranger
 Kazuhiko Inada – co-producer and synthesizer programming
 Mitsuko Akai – drums on "Tell Me"
 Ryuichi – vocals on "Scanner"
Personnel for 1994 single per its liner notes.

2000 Recording
 hide – vocals, guitar, producer
 I.N.A. – co-producer, arranger, programming and editing
 Kiyoshi – guitar
 Kaz – guitar
 Chirolyn – bass
 Joe – drums
 D.I.E. – keyboards
Personnel for 2000 single per its liner notes.

Cover versions
"Tell Me" and "Scanner" were covered by Kyo and Tetsu (both currently of D'erlanger, but previously in hide's old band Saver Tiger) and Luna Sea on the 1999 hide tribute album Tribute Spirits. Luna Sea performed their cover live at the hide memorial summit on May 4, 2008, and "Tell Me" was covered live by heidi. earlier that same day. A studio version of "Tell Me" by heidi. appears on the Tribute II -Visual Spirits- album, which was released on July 3, 2013. For Tribute VI -Female Spirits-, released on December 18, 2013, "Tell Me" was covered by Thelma Aoyama. The song was covered by Granrodeo for the June 6, 2018 Tribute Impulse album.

References

External links

Hide (musician) songs
1994 singles
2000 singles
1994 songs
Songs written by hide (musician)